Kotli is a city in Kotli District of Azad Kashmir in Pakistan. It lies on the Poonch River, and the river contains several waterfalls, including the Lala Waterfall near the town of Kotli, and the Gulpur Waterfalls at the village of Gulpur to the southwest. As per the 2017 Census of Pakistan, Kotli had a population of 46,907.

History 

The city of Kotli can be dated back to the fifteenth century, when it was settled by a branch of the Royal Mangral family of Hindu Rajputs, Raja Mangar Pal. Back then it was known by the name of Kohtali, meaning "under mountain". Kotli remained independent until subdued by Ranjit Singh in 1819.

After the independence of Pakistan and India from the British Raj, the army of the newly created state of India reached Kotli in November 1947. They evacuated the garrison at the town. The Pakistani Army counter-attacked with the aid of the native tribesmen. It has been under Pakistani control ever since.

Education 
Kotil is home to the University of Kotli (کوٹلی یونیورسٹی) (UoK), formerly a constituent college of the University of Azad Jammu and Kashmir. It became a university as a result of Presidential Ordinance VIII passed in 2014.

References

Populated places in Kotli District
Tehsils of Kotli District